Werner Schwarz (born 12 April 1952) is an Austrian former footballer who played as a midfielder for Austria WAC Wien and SSW Innsbruck. He made three appearances for the Austria national team in 1976.

References

External links
 

1952 births
Living people
Sportspeople from Innsbruck
Austrian footballers
Footballers from Tyrol (state)
Association football midfielders
Austria international footballers
Austrian Football Bundesliga players
FK Austria Wien players
FC Wacker Innsbruck players
Austrian football managers
FC Wacker Innsbruck managers